Miss Venezuela 1986 was the 33rd Miss Venezuela pageant, was held in Caracas, Venezuela on May 9, 1986, after weeks of events.  The winner of the pageant was Bárbara Palacios, Miss Trujillo.

The pageant was broadcast live on Venevisión from the Teatro Municipal in Caracas. At the conclusion of the final night of competition, outgoing titleholder Silvia Martínez, crowned Bárbara Palacios of Trujillo as the new Miss Venezuela.

Results
Miss Venezuela 1986 - Bárbara Palacios Teyde (Miss Trujillo)
Miss World Venezuela 1986 - María Begoña Juaristi (Miss Zulia) 

The runners-up were:
1st runner-up - Nancy Gallardo (Miss Portuguesa)
2nd runner-up - Laura Fazzolari (Miss Táchira)
3rd runner-up - Maite Delgado (Miss Anzoátegui)
4th runner-up - Catherine Fulop (Miss Departamento Vargas)
5th runner-up - Raquel Lares (Miss Sucre)
6th runner-up - Yoelis Sánchez (Miss Guárico)

Special awards
 Miss Photogenic (voted by press reporters) - Maite Delgado (Miss Anzoátegui)
 Miss Congeniality - Grizel Herrera (Miss Delta Amacuro)
 Miss Elegance - Nancy Gallardo (Miss Portuguesa)

Delegates
The Miss Venezuela 1986 delegates are:

 Miss Amazonas - Yukency Teresita Sapucki Tovar
 Miss Anzoátegui - Maite Coromoto Delgado González
 Miss Apure - María Luisa Palazón Valverde
 Miss Aragua - Indira Mass Lafont
 Miss Barinas - Betzabeth Emilia Coelles Araujo
 Miss Bolívar - Hilda De Estéfano Fuenmayor
 Miss Carabobo - Lorena María Tosta Jentsch
 Miss Delta Amacuro - Grizel Beatriz Herrera Villegas
 Miss Departamento Libertador - Marisol Ayala Vera
 Miss Departamento Vargas - Catherine Amanda Fulop García
 Miss Distrito Federal - Jackeline Alberdi Villanueva
  Miss Falcón - Leonela Lanz Alvarez
 Miss Guárico - Yoelis Sánchez Azpúrua
 Miss Lara - Laura Schettini Fanelli
 Miss Mérida - Elvira Moreno Rivero
 Miss Miranda - Lucía Carolina Perpetuo González
 Miss Monagas - María Carolina Pacheco
 Miss Nueva Esparta - Clara Catherine Taormina Severino
 Miss Portuguesa - Nancy Josefina Gallardo Quiñones
 Miss Sucre - Raquel Teresa Lares Rivero
 Miss Táchira - Laura Inés Fazzolari Scurria
 Miss Trujillo - Bárbara Palacios Teyde
 Miss Yaracuy - Alicia Lammensdorf Beliauskaite
 Miss Zulia - María Begoña Juaristi Mateo

External links
Miss Venezuela official website

1986 beauty pageants
1986 in Venezuela